Miss Israel is a national beauty pageant in Israel. The pageant was founded in 1950, where the winners were sent to Miss Universe. The pageant was also existing to send delegates to Miss World, Miss International, Miss Europe and Miss Asia Pacific International. The 1980 competition was held in Yad Eliyahu Arena, Tel Aviv. Illana Diamant was the winner.

Results

External links

1980 beauty pageants
1980 in Israel
Miss Israel